Adriana Eleni Lita is a materials scientist. She works in the Faint Photonics Group at the National Institute of Standards and Technology, where her research has included Bell test experiments and the practical implementation of quantum key distribution. She completed a Ph.D. at University of Michigan in 2000. Her dissertation was titled Correlation between microstructure and surface structure evolution in polycrystalline films. Her doctoral advisor was John E. Sanchez, Jr.

Selected publications

See also 

 Timeline of women in science in the United States

References

External links 
 
 

Living people
Year of birth missing (living people)
Place of birth missing (living people)
National Institute of Standards and Technology people
21st-century American women scientists
Women materials scientists and engineers
American materials scientists
Nationality missing
University of Michigan alumni